Brevundimonas balnearis is a bacterium from the genus of Brevundimonas which has been isolated from well water from the Gellért thermal bath in Hungary.

References

External links
Type strain of Brevundimonas balnearis at BacDive -  the Bacterial Diversity Metadatabase

Bacteria described in 2017
Caulobacterales